Pauline Matthews (born 6 March 1947), better known by her stage name Kiki Dee, is an English pop singer. Known for her blue-eyed soul vocals, she was the first female singer from the UK to sign with Motown's Tamla Records.

Dee is best known for her 1973 hit "Amoureuse", her 1974 hit "I've Got the Music in Me" and "Don't Go Breaking My Heart", her 1976 duet with Elton John, which went to number 1 on both the UK Singles Chart and the US Billboard Hot 100 chart. Her 1981 single "Star" became the theme song for the talent show Opportunity Knocks when it was revived by the BBC in 1987. In 1993, she performed another duet with John for his Duets album, a cover version of Cole Porter's "True Love", which reached number 2 in the UK. During her career, she has released 40 singles, three EPs and 12 albums.

Early life
Dee was born in Bradford, West Riding of Yorkshire, England. At the age of 10 she won a local talent contest, and at 16 she had her first paid job in show business. "I realised when I sang at family parties and Christmases I'd suddenly get everyone's attention and, being the youngest of three, I thought what a brilliant attention-seeking ploy it was," stated Dee in a 2013 interview. She went on to say: "My older brother had a lot of Elvis on vinyl and really that was my first introduction to music during the Fifties."

Aged 16, Dee worked at Boots in Bradford during the day, whilst in the evenings she sang songs with a dance band in Leeds. A record scout liked her singing and invited her to London to do an audition. There, in 1963, she signed as a solo artist to Fontana Records.

Career

Musician
After singing with a local band in Bradford in the early 1960s, Dee began her recording career as a session singer. She sang backing vocals for Dusty Springfield, among others, but did not achieve solo success in the UK for many years. In 1963, Dee released her first single, "Early Night", the first of eleven singles on Fontana, none of which reached the charts. Her 1966 release "Why Don't I Run Away From You" (a cover of Tami Lynn's "I'm Gonna Run Away From You") was a big hit on Radio London and Radio Caroline, and she sang the B-side "Small Town" in her appearance in Dateline Diamonds the same year. Also in 1966, she achieved wider coverage by singing "Take a Look at Me" in the hit comedy, Doctor in Clover. She brought out an EP, Kiki In Clover – which included "Take a Look at Me" – at the same time as the film's release.

She recorded her debut album, I'm Kiki Dee, in 1968 which included a series of Phil Spector-style tracks and covers. Her 1968 release "On a Magic Carpet Ride", which was originally a B-side, has remained popular on the Northern soul circuit. Much of her early recorded work for Fontana Records, was released on 24 January 2011, on the CD compilation I'm Kiki Dee.

Songwriter Mitch Murray created her stage name, and penned her first single, "Early Night". In the United States she became the first white British artist to be signed by Motown, releasing her first Motown single in 1970.

In the days before BBC Radio 1, Dee was a regular performer of cover versions on BBC Radio, and she starred with a group of session singers in the BBC Two singalong series, One More Time. She also appeared in an early episode of The Benny Hill Show in January 1971, performing the Blood, Sweat and Tears hit, "You've Made Me So Very Happy". Nevertheless, it was only after she signed with Elton John's label, The Rocket Record Company, that she became a household name in the UK. Her first major solo hits were "Amoureuse" (written by Véronique Sanson, with English lyrics by Gary Osborne) (1973) and "I've Got the Music in Me" (written by Tobias Stephen Boshell), the latter credited to the Kiki Dee Band (1974). In addition to her burgeoning career as a lead vocalist, she could sometimes be heard singing backing vocals on various John recordings, such as "All the Girls Love Alice" from Goodbye Yellow Brick Road and various tracks on Rock of the Westies. 

Her biggest hit came in 1976, when she replaced an ailing Dusty Springfield for the recording of a duet with John, "Don't Go Breaking My Heart" (pseudonymously written by John and lyricist Bernie Taupin). The single reached number 1 in both the UK and US, remaining at the top for six weeks in the UK. At the end of the summer, she played as support act to Queen at their Hyde Park concert in front of a crowd of 150,000 people. Prior to the concert, in an interview for Record Mirror, she stated, "My confidence is at an all-time high."

After a quiet period in the late 1970s, Dee launched a comeback in 1981, releasing one of her biggest hits, "Star", written by Doreen Chanter of the Chanter Sisters. This later became the theme music to the BBC1 programme Opportunity Knocks between 1987 and 1990. Dee joined forces again with John in 1981, recording a cover of the Four Tops' song "Loving You Is Sweeter Than Ever" which was written by Ivy Jo Hunter and Stevie Wonder. Both of these were included on her album Perfect Timing, which became a modest hit on the album chart, and she supplied backing vocals for John's 1983 album Too Low for Zero. Dee also sang the song "What Can't Speak Can't Lie" (1983), composed and recorded by the Japanese jazz fusion group Casiopea, and with lyrics by Gary Osborne. 

She performed at Live Aid in 1985, reprising "Don't Go Breaking My Heart" with John, and performing backing vocals on the other songs in his set. After signing to Columbia, Dee released the album Angel Eyes in 1987. She contributed backing vocals to Elton John's 1992 album The One, and a year later recorded "True Love" with John for his 1993 album Duets.

Dee released the live album Almost Naked, a joint effort with Carmelo Luggeri in 1995, followed by the studio albums Where Rivers Meet (1998) and The Walk Of Faith (2005) with Luggeri. In September 2013, Dee and Luggeri released their third studio album, A Place Where I Can Go, on Spellbound Records. They have been touring together ever since.

Dee's single "Sidesteppin' with a Soul Man," released in October 2013, was her 40th single release.

Musical theatre
Dee has also appeared in musical theatre, notably in the lead role in Willy Russell's West End musical Blood Brothers, in which she took on the role originally played by Barbara Dickson for the 1988 production and recording. She received an Olivier Award nomination in 1989 in the Best Actress in a Musical category. In 1990, she contributed to the last recording studio collaboration between Alan Parsons and Eric Woolfson, on the album Freudiana, performing "You're On Your Own" and part of "No One Can Love You Better Than Me".

In 2008, Dee's first DVD was released. Under The Night Sky was a collaboration with guitarist Carmelo Luggeri, filmed live at the Bray Studios in London; the music was produced by Ted Carfrae. That same year, several albums from her earlier 1970s–1980s Rocket catalogue were re-released by EMI Records, including an expanded edition of Almost Naked with extra tracks, such as a cover of Neil Young's "Heart of Gold" and a new take on "Sugar on the Floor". The same year, Demon Records (UK) issued a remastered edition of Perfect Timing, with several bonus tracks, including an alternate mix of "Loving You Is Sweeter Than Ever."

Dee had previously starred in Pump Boys and Dinettes in London's West End, at the Piccadilly Theatre, from 20 September 1984 to 8 June 1985.

In popular culture
In 2019, Dee was portrayed by actress Rachel Muldoon in the Elton John biopic Rocketman.

Personal life
In her 40s, Dee was diagnosed with uterine cancer.

Discography
Kiki Dee has released 40 singles, three EPs and 12 albums.

Albums

Singles

DVDs
2008 – Under the Night Sky Live (with Carmelo Luggeri) – New Wave Pictures (produced by Ted Carfrae)

References

External links

Official website
[ Kiki Dee biography at Allmusic]

1947 births
Living people
20th-century English singers
20th-century English women singers
Columbia Records artists
Columbia Graphophone Company artists
EMI Records artists
English women pop singers
English mezzo-sopranos
English songwriters
Fontana Records artists
Motown artists
Musicians from Bradford
Northern soul musicians
People from Little Horton
Rocket Records artists